HBA Panthers
 Islanders FC
 Old Madrid
 One Love United
 St Lucian Stars
 Sugar Boys
 VG Ballstars
 VG United
 Wolues FC

British Virgin Islands
 
Football Clubs
Football clubs